Matfield Green is a city in Chase County, Kansas, United States.  As of the 2020 census, the population of the city was 49.  It is located along K-177 highway.

History

Early history

For many millennia, the Great Plains of North America was inhabited by nomadic Native Americans.  The historic Native American tribes of Kansas are many, including the Kansa, or "Wind People," from whom the name of the state is derived. Also included are the related Osage, Pawnee, and Wichita. From the west and north ranged the Comanche and Apache, as well as the Kiowa, Cheyenne and Arapaho.

From the 16th century to 18th century, the Kingdom of France claimed ownership of large parts of North America.  In 1762, after the French and Indian War, France secretly ceded New France to Spain, per the Treaty of Fontainebleau.

19th century
In 1802, Spain returned most of the land to France.  In 1803, most of the land for modern day Kansas was acquired by the United States from France as part of the 828,000 square mile Louisiana Purchase for 2.83 cents per acre.

In 1854, the Kansas Territory was organized, then in 1861 Kansas became the 34th U.S. state.  In 1859, Chase County was established within the Kansas Territory, which included the land for modern day Matfield Green.

Matfield Green was named after Matfield, in England.

In 1870, Bazaar Township, Chase County, Kansas which includes Matfield Green had a population of 376, growing to 1,096 by 1880. In its heyday, at the beginning of the 20th century, Matfield Green grew to about 350 residents and possessed a bank, grocery store, livery and blacksmith, hardware, flour mill and lumberyard, and even a hotel for visitors. It also had its own schools. A post office existed in Matfield Green from January 11, 1867 to September 30, 1995.

Present
Like many small towns in Kansas, Matfield Green struggles to maintain its existence. It is helped by a small colony of artists and writers who work to preserve the community, along with the nearby historic Pioneer Bluffs ranch headquarters. Additionally great conservation efforts have been made by both private individuals such as Texas billionaire Ed Bass and non profit organizations Nature Conservancy to combat development and preserve the Flint Hills, which is one of the most threatened ecosystems in the world.

Geography

Matfield Green is located at  (38.159609, -96.562013)., in the scenic Flint Hills of the Great Plains.

Climate
The climate in this area is characterized by hot, humid summers and generally mild to cool winters.  According to the Köppen Climate Classification system, Matfield Green has a humid subtropical climate, abbreviated "Cfa" on climate maps.

Area attractions
Matfield Green has two ranches on the National Register of Historic Places (NRHP):  Crocker Ranch (NRHP).  1908-1940 Pioneer Bluffs Ranch (NRHP), approximately 1 mile north on K-177 Highway.  Pioneer Bluffs is an early twentieth century ranch, consisting of one dozen vintage farm buildings.

Demographics

Matfield Green is part of the Emporia Micropolitan Statistical Area.

2010 census
As of the census of 2010, there were 47 people, 24 households, and 11 families residing in the city. The racial makeup of the city was 100.0% White.

There were 24 households, of which 16.7% had children under the age of 18 living with them, 41.7% were married couples living together, 4.2% had a male householder with no wife present, and 54.2% were non-families. 37.5% of all households were made up of individuals, and 16.6% had someone living alone who was 65 years of age or older. The average household size was 1.96 and the average family size was 2.73.

The median age in the city was 58.8 years. 17% of residents were under the age of 18; 0.0% were between the ages of 18 and 24; 12.8% were from 25 to 44; 34.1% were from 45 to 64; and 36.2% were 65 years of age or older. The gender makeup of the city was 51.1% male and 48.9% female.

2000 census
As of the census of 2000, there were 60 people, 31 households, and 18 families residing in the city. The racial makeup of the city was 100.00% White.

There were 31 households, out of which 29.0% had children under the age of 18 living with them, 45.2% were married couples living together, and 41.9% were non-families. 38.7% of all households were made up of individuals, and 22.6% had someone living alone who was 65 years of age or older. The average household size was 1.94 and the average family size was 2.56.

In the city, the population was spread out, with 20.0% under the age of 18, 1.7% from 18 to 24, 23.3% from 25 to 44, 31.7% from 45 to 64, and 23.3% who were 65 years of age or older. The median age was 49 years. For every 100 females, there were 114.3 males. For every 100 females age 18 and over, there were 128.6 males.

As of 2000 the median income for a household in the city was $27,500, and the median income for a family was $29,375. Males had a median income of $23,750 versus $14,375 for females. The per capita income for the city was $17,642. There were 19.0% of families and 19.4% of the population living below the poverty line, including 35.7% of under eighteens and none of those over 64.

Government
The Matfield Green government consists of a mayor and five council members.  The council meets the 1st Monday of each month at 7PM.
 City Hall, 302 Orient Street.

Education
The community is served by Chase County USD 284 public school district.  It has two schools.
 Chase County Junior/Senior High School, 600 Main St in Cottonwood Falls.
 Chase County Elementary School, 401 Maple St in Cottonwood Falls.

Matfield Green schools were closed through school unification. The Matfield Green High School mascot was Matfield Green Panthers.

Infrastructure

Transportation
K-177 highway and Southern Transcon main line of BNSF Railway both pass through Matfield Green. The Kansas Turnpike toll road is close to Matfield Green, but a driver must exit the toll plaza in Cassoday and enter K-177 (Kansas highway) going north.

Utilities
 Internet
 Satellite Internet is provided by HughesNet, StarBand, WildBlue.
 TV
 Satellite TV is provided by DirecTV, Dish Network.
 Free over-the-air ATSC digital TV.

See also
 National Register of Historic Places listings in Chase County, Kansas

References

Further reading

External links

 Matfield Green - Directory of Public Officials
 Chase County Chamber of Commerce
 Matfield Green, a "Quiet" town in Chase County, Kansas, History and photographs.
 Rockne Memorial, site of the TWA crash that killed Knute Rockne.
 Matfield Green city map, KDOT
 Topo Map of Matfield Green area, USGS

Cities in Kansas
Cities in Chase County, Kansas
Emporia, Kansas micropolitan area